1992 Ireland rugby union tour of New Zealand. The Ireland national rugby union team embarked on their second tour of New Zealand, having previously visited in 1976.
The tour party included father and son – tour manager Noel Murphy and his son Kenny Murphy. In 1993 Mick Galwey, Vince Cunningham, Richard Wallace and Nick Popplewell all returned to New Zealand with the British and Irish Lions.

Non-international matches
Scores and results list Ireland's points tally first.

Test matches

Touring party
 Tour Manager: Noel Murphy
 Team Manager: Ciaran Fitzgerald
 Assistant Manager: Gerry Murphy
 Captain: Phil Danaher

Backs

Forwards

See also
 History of rugby union matches between All Blacks and Ireland

References

1992 
1992 rugby union tours
1992 in New Zealand rugby union
New Zealand